Jean-Ernest Ramez (15 May 1932 – 17 November 2020) was a French fencer. He competed in the team sabre events at the 1964 and 1968 Summer Olympics.

References

External links
 

1932 births
2020 deaths
French male sabre fencers
Olympic fencers of France
Fencers at the 1964 Summer Olympics
Fencers at the 1968 Summer Olympics
Universiade medalists in fencing
Sportspeople from Nord (French department)
Universiade bronze medalists for France
Medalists at the 1959 Summer Universiade